The Beaverton Downtown Historic District comprises a primarily commercial and civic portion of downtown Beaverton, Oregon, United States. Beaverton's historic commercial core remains largely intact as a pedestrian-oriented business district constructed along the street pattern from the city's earliest plats. Significant buildings include a handful from the city's first decades (1868–1920) and a larger number from the period of profound transformation between the world wars (1920–1940). The district was listed on the National Register of Historic Places in 1986.

See also
National Register of Historic Places listings in Washington County, Oregon

References

External links

1986 establishments in Oregon
Beaverton, Oregon
Historic districts on the National Register of Historic Places in Oregon
National Register of Historic Places in Washington County, Oregon